Dwayne Allen Burno (June 10, 1970 – December 28, 2013) was an American jazz bassist born in Philadelphia, Pennsylvania who became a first-call musician on the New York City jazz scene.

Biography
Dwayne Burno began playing bass at the age of 16, attended the Berklee College of Music for three semesters beginning in 1988, and played professionally in 1989 with Donald Harrison. By 1990, Burno was twenty years old and living in New York City working as a member of Betty Carter’s backing trio. Over time he recorded and performed with many major figures in jazz, including Junior Cook, Orrin Evans, Herbie Hancock, Joe Henderson, Clifford Jordan, Abbey Lincoln, Wynton Marsalis, Ronnie Mathews, Mulgrew Miller, David Murray, Greg Osby, Nicholas Payton, Wallace Roney, Steve Turre, Chucho Valdés, and Cedar Walton.  He also led his own quintet which played regularly at Smalls Jazz Club.  Diagnosed with kidney disease in 2004, Burno had a kidney transplant in 2010, and died on December 28, 2013, at the age of 43.  Two days before his death, Burno played his last gig at Smalls on December 26 with Peter Bernstein, Steve Nelson, and Billy Drummond. He was survived by his wife Wendy and their son Quinn.

Discography

 
With Eric Alexander
Man With A Horn (Milestone, 1999)
With Carl Allen
The Dark Side of Dewey (Evidence, 1993)
With William Ash
The Phoenix (Smalls, 2004)
With Don Braden
The Voice of the Saxophone (RCA, 1997)
Fire Within (RCA, 1999)
Brighter Days (HighNote, 2001)
With Marc Cary
Cary On (Enja, 1995)
With Sharel Cassity
Relentless (Jazz Legacy Productions, 2009)
With Joe Chambers
The Outlaw (Savant, 2006)
Horace to Max (Savant, 2010)
Moving Pictures Orchestra (Savant, 2012)
With George Colligan
Activism (SteepleChase, 1996)
Newcomer (SteepleChase, 1997)
With Ravi Coltrane
Tenor Conclave: A Tribute to Hank Mobley (Evidence, 1997)
With Stanley Cowell
Hear Me One (SteepleChase, 1997)
With Jesse Davis
As We Speak (Concord Jazz, 1992)
Young at Art (Concord Jazz, 1993)
With Steve Davis
Meant to Be (Criss Cross Jazz, 2004)
With Xavier Davis
The Dance of Life (Metropolitan, 1999)
With Dena DeRose
Another World (Sharp Nine, 1999)
With Digable Planets
Blowout Comb (Pendulum/EMI, 1994)
With Mike DiRubbo
Keep Steppin'  (Criss Cross Jazz, 2001)
New York Accent (Cellar Live, 2007)
Repercussion (Positone, 2009)
With Johannes Enders
Bright Nights (Enja, 1998)
With Duane Eubanks
Second Take (TCB, 2001)
With Taeko Fukao
One Love (Flat Nine, 2007)
With David Gibson
Maya (Nagel Heyer, 2002)
The Path to Delphi (Nagel Heyer, 2005)
G-Rays (Nagel Heyer, 2008)
With Greg Gisbert
Harcology (Criss Cross Jazz, 1992)
With Benny Golson
Up Jumped Benny (Arkadia Jazz, 1997)
Tenor Legacy (Arkadia Jazz, 1996 [1998])
One Day, Forever (Arkadia Jazz, 1996 [2001])
With Jimmy Greene
Brand New World (RCA, 2000)
With Tom Guarna
Major Minor (SteepleChase, 2009)
With Roy Hargrove
Nothing Serious (Verve, 2006)
With Philip Harper
"Soulful Sin" (Muse, 1993)
With Stefon Harris
A Cloud of Red Dust (Blue Note, 1998)
With Donald Harrison
Full Circle (Sweet Basil Records, 1990)
Funky New Orleans (Metro, 2000) with Dr. John
New Orleans Gumbo (Candid, 2013) with Dr. John
With Roy Haynes
Praise (Disques Dreyfus, 1998)

With Kevin Hays
Crossroad (SteepleChase, 1995)
With David Hazeltine
Blues Quarters, Vol. 1 (Criss Cross Jazz, 2000) 
With Todd Herbert
The Path to Infinity (Metropolitan, 2007)
The Tree of Life (Metropolitan, 2008)
With Vincent Herring
Dawnbird (Landmark, 1993)
With John Hicks
Cry Me a River (Venus, 1997)
With Freddie Hubbard
New Colors (Hip Bop Essence, 2001)
On the Real Side (Times Square, 2008) 
With Bobby Hutcherson
For Sentimental Reasons (Kind of Blue, 2007)
With Ingrid Jensen
Here on Earth (Enja, 1997)
With Randy Johnston
Is It You? (HighNote, 2005)
With Willie Jones, III
Vol. 3 (WJ3, 2006)
With Peter Leitch
Blues on the Corner (Reservoir, 2000)
Autobiography (Reservoir, 2004)
With Brian Lynch
Brian Lynch meets Bill Charlap (Sharp Nine, 2004)
With Harold Mabern
Somewhere Over the Rainbow (Venus Jazz, 2005)
With Joe Magnarelli
Live at Smalls (SmallsLIVE, 2013)
With The New Jazz Composers Octet
First Steps into Reality (Fresh Sound New Talent, 1999)
Walkin’ the Line (Fresh Sound New Talent, 2003)
The Turning Gate (Motéma, 2008)
With Jeremy Pelt
November (MAXJAZZ, 2008)
Men of Honor (HighNote, 2010)
The Talented Mr. Pelt (HighNote, 2011)
Soul (HighNote, 2012)
With Luis Perdomo
Links (Criss Cross Jazz, 2013)
With Eric Reed
Soldier’s Hymn (Candid, 1990)
From My Heart (Savant, 2002)
With Justin Robinson
The Challenge (Arabesque, 1998)
In the Spur of the Moment (WJ3, 2012)
Alana’s Fantasy (Criss Cross Jazz, 2014) recorded November 4, 2013
With Jim Rotondi
Introducing Jim Rotondi (Criss Cross Jazz, 1997)
With John Sneider
Panorama (Double-Time, 2000)
With John Swana
Tug of War (Criss Cross Jazz, 1999)
With Michal Urbaniak
Ask Me Now (SteepleChase, 2000)
With Myron Walden
Hypnosis (NYC Music, 1996)
Like a Flower Seeking the Sun (NYC Music, 1999)
With David Weiss
The Mirror (Fresh Sound New Talent, 2004)
Endangered Species: The Music of Wayne Shorter (Motéma, 2013)
With Scott Wendholt
The Scheme of Things (Criss Cross Jazz, 1993)
With Pete Yellin
How Long Has This Been Going On? (Jazzed Media, 2008)

References

1970 births
2013 deaths
Deaths from kidney failure
Post-bop double-bassists
American double-bassists
Male double-bassists
Musicians from Philadelphia
American male jazz musicians
The New Jazz Composers Octet members